The Aquarians is a 1970 American television action film directed by Don McDougall. It stars  Ricardo Montalbán, José Ferrer and Leslie Nielsen.

References

External links

1970 television films
1970 films
1970 action films
American television films
Films scored by Lalo Schifrin
1970s English-language films
Films directed by Don McDougall